George Soudon Bridgman was an architect and civil engineer, active in the late 19th century in Torquay, Devon and the local area. He is best known for his work in the seaside resort of Paignton, designing Oldway Mansion and Paignton Pier within that town, as well as designing the sea wall and promenade at Paignton Beach. He was part of several other local projects and was considered as being so significant to the development of the town, that he became known as 'the Father of Paignton'.

Life 
Bridgman was born in 1839. His brothers were Albert Bridgman and Henry Hewitt Brigman. He moved from Torquay to London, returning in 1864 to work at Harvey Brothers (Builders) in Torquay whilst he qualified for his architectural articles. Once qualified he set up his own architect's practice in Paignton, becoming a master mason.

Frank Matcham joined his office at age fourteen, and returned to work for Bridgman as his chief assistant after being apprenticed to a quantity surveyor in London, before moving on to join the practice of Jethro Thomas Robinson.

He was a freemason who gave a site for new lodge premises in Paignton and laid the foundation stone along with the secretary of the lodge on 15 April 1891.

George Soudon Bridgman died age 86 on 3 April 1925. He was buried in Paignton Municipal Cemetery.

Work

Oldway Mansion 
Around 1871 Bridgman was commissioned by Isaac Merrit Singer, who was the founder of the Singer Sewing Machine Company, to construct Oldway Mansion on land recently purchased by the latter in Paignton. As well as the mansion, he designed a circular riding pavilion, later be termed 'The Wigwam' by Singer. Singer wanted a theatre in the house and in 1873 Frank Matcham was named in the request for tender section as being the accepted party to work alongside Bridgeman on this aspect of the Oldway Mansion project.

Paignton Pier 
Bridgman was commissioned by a local Paignton barrister, Arthur Hyde Dendy, to design a pier for the town. The construction was begun in 1878 to his design, and the pier opened in 1879. It remains standing to this day, and continues to be popular with both locals and visitors to the resort.

St Marychurch Town Hall 
In 1866, Bridgman received a prize of £25 for his design for St Marychurch Town Hall. The hall cost £2,718 to build and opened in November 1883. It was sold to a developer in 2005 and subsequently converted into flats.

Personal life 
Bridgman married Miss E Norman (d. 28 March 1900) in 1863,setting up home at Courtland Road in Paignton. They had eight children, including Norman George Bridgman (b. 1869) who also became an architect.

Following his first wife's death, Bridgman married Eliza (Lizzie) Black, and they moved back to Torquay in January 1902 where they lived until his death.

Commemoration 
Bridgman's name appears on three blue plaques in Paington.

References 

1839 births
Architects from Devon
English Freemasons
English civil engineers
1925 deaths